William Bagley may refer to:

 William Bagley (educator) (1874–1946), American educator and editor
 William Bagley (footballer), English footballer
 William Henry Bagley (1833–1886), American military officer, politician, and newspaperman